Koton or Rando (died 1991) was a German Shepherd police dog who played Jerry Lee in the 1989 movie K-9 with James Belushi. He also starred in a short lived TV series of the same name. Prior to being in the movie/TV series, Koton worked for the Kansas City Police Department as a K-9 officer. On November 18, 1991, Koton was fatally shot while trying to apprehend a suspect in the murder of a police officer.

People magazine stated that the dog in the film was named Rando, not Koton.

Filmography
K-9 (1989)

References

External links

Dog actors
Police dogs
German shepherds